Z'Goum is a village in the commune of Hassani Abdelkrim, in Debila District, El Oued Province, Algeria. The village is located just to the east of the N16 highway adjacent to Hassani Abdelkrim.

References

Neighbouring towns and cities

Populated places in El Oued Province